St. Marys is a city and the county seat of Pleasants County, West Virginia,  United States.  The population was 1,847 at the 2020 census.  St. Marys was established in 1849 by Alexander Creel, who is said to have had a vision of Mary while passing the townsite by boat on the Ohio River.

St. Marys is part of the Parkersburg-Marietta-Vienna, WV-OH Metropolitan Statistical Area.

Train tracks run down the middle of 2nd Street in St. Marys, and freight trains running through the middle of downtown St. Marys are a common sight.  It is one of the few remaining towns in the United States where freight trains actually share city streets with automotive traffic.

Geography

St. Marys is located at  (39.396393, -81.199701), along the Ohio River at the mouth of Middle Island Creek.  Middle Island, which is part of the Ohio River Islands National Wildlife Refuge, is located in the Ohio River beside St. Marys; a bridge connects the city to the island.

Demographics

2010 census
As of the census of 2010, there were 1,860 people, 841 households, and 543 families living in the city. The racial makeup of the city was 99.0% White, 0.1% African American, 0.2% Native American, 0.2% Asian, 0.1% from other races, and 0.4% from two or more races. Hispanic or Latino of any race were 1.3% of the population.

There were 841 households, of which 27.6% had children under the age of 18 living with them, 47.2% were married couples living together, 11.7% had a female householder with no husband present, 5.7% had a male householder with no wife present, and 35.4% were non-families. 31.2% of all households were made up of individuals, and 16% had someone living alone who was 65 years of age or older. The average household size was 2.21 and the average family size was 2.73.

The median age in the city was 43.9 years. 20.5% of residents were under the age of 18; 8% were between the ages of 18 and 24; 23.2% were from 25 to 44; 28.8% were from 45 to 64; and 19.5% were 65 years of age or older. The gender makeup of the city was 49.1% male and 50.9% female.

2000 census
As of the census of 2000, there were 2,017 people, 879 households, and 588 families living in the city. The population density was 2,074.1 people per square mile (802.9/km2). There were 961 housing units at an average density of 988.2 per square mile (382.5/km2). The racial makeup of the city was 98.56% White, 0.05% African American, 0.64% Native American, 0.30% Asian, 0.15% from other races, and 0.30% from two or more races. Hispanic or Latino of any race were 0.25% of the population.

There were 879 households, out of which 29.2% had children under the age of 18 living with them, 52.0% were married couples living together, 11.3% had a female householder with no husband present, and 33.0% were non-families. 30.9% of all households were made up of individuals, and 18.8% had someone living alone who was 65 years of age or older. The average household size was 2.29 and the average family size was 2.81.

In the city, the population was spread out, with 22.2% under the age of 18, 7.1% from 18 to 24, 25.4% from 25 to 44, 24.5% from 45 to 64, and 20.8% who were 65 years of age or older. The median age was 42 years. For every 100 females, there were 90.1 males. For every 100 females age 18 and over, there were 84.3 males.

The median income for a household in the city was $30,755, and the median income for a family was $37,621. Males had a median income of $31,000 versus $21,522 for females. The per capita income for the city was $17,206. About 12.8% of families and 15.3% of the population were below the poverty line, including 19.0% of those under age 18 and 12.3% of those age 65 or over.

See also
 List of cities and towns along the Ohio River
 Pleasants County Courthouse
 Cain House
 Billy Greenhorn

References

County seats in West Virginia
Cities in Pleasants County, West Virginia
Populated places established in 1849
West Virginia populated places on the Ohio River
1849 establishments in Virginia
Cities in West Virginia